The 2003 Women's United Soccer Association season was the third and final season for WUSA, the first top level professional women's soccer league in the United States. The regular season began on April 5 and ended on August 10.  The playoffs began on August 16, with the championship match between played on August 24 between the  Washington Freedom and the Atlanta Beat.

Competition format

The regular season began on April 5 and ended on August 10.
Each team played a total of 21 games, three against each opponent (either twice at home and once away or vice versa).  This caused an uneven schedule with teams hosting either 10 or 11 home games each.
The four teams with the most points from the regular season qualified for the playoffs. The regular season champions and runners-up hosted the fourth- and third-placed teams, respectively, in the single-game semifinals on August 17.  The winners of the semifinals met at Torero Stadium in San Diego, California for the final on August 24.

Standings

Playoffs

Semi-finals

Founders Cup III

Awards

Source:

See also

 List of WUSA drafts

References

External links
 WUSA Website (archive.org)
 WUSA on Fun While It Lasted

 
2003
2002–03 domestic women's association football leagues
2003–04 domestic women's association football leagues
1
2003 in American soccer leagues